Harold Haywood Capers (October 10, 1906 – January 15, 1961), nicknamed "Lefty", was an American Negro league pitcher in the 1930s.

A native of Savannah, Georgia, Capers made his Negro leagues debut in 1930 with the Louisville Black Caps. He played for Louisville again the following season as the team took the name "White Sox". Capers died in Boston, Massachusetts in 1961 at age 54.

References

External links
 and Baseball-Reference Black Baseball stats and Seamheads

1906 births
1961 deaths
Louisville Black Caps players
Louisville White Sox players
Baseball pitchers
Baseball players from Savannah, Georgia
20th-century African-American sportspeople